Chomoqlu Sheyda (also Romanized as Chomoqlū Sheydā and Chomoqlū-ye Sheydā; also known as Chagholū-ye Sheydā, Chāmagūlī, Chāmeh Gūl, Chamghola Sheīda, Chamgholū-ye Sheydā, Chamqolū, and Chamqolū) is a village in Lak Rural District, Serishabad District, Qorveh County, Kurdistan Province, Iran. At the 2006 census, its population was 173, in 42 families. The village is populated by Kurds.

References 

Towns and villages in Qorveh County
Kurdish settlements in Kurdistan Province